Alex Lopes do Nasciment (born April 22, 1969) is a former Brazilian football player.

Playing career
Alex joined Japanese J1 League club Cerezo Osaka with Claudinho in July 1997. On July 30, he debuted in J1 against Vissel Kobe. He played many matches as midfielder and left the club end of 1997 season.

Club statistics

References

External links

 
 

1969 births
Living people
Brazilian footballers
J1 League players
Cerezo Osaka players
Brazilian expatriate footballers
Expatriate footballers in Japan
Association football midfielders